Ectoedemia pubescivora is a moth of the family Nepticulidae. It is found in southern France, the Iberian Peninsula, Switzerland, northern Italy, Sardinia and Sicily.

The wingspan is 5–6 mm. Adults are on wing from May to the first half of June. There is one generation per year.

The larvae feed on Quercus pubescens. They mine the leaves of their host plant. The mine consists of a corridor, generally following a vein, that abruptly widens into a blotch.

External links
Fauna Europaea
bladmineerders.nl
A Taxonomic Revision Of The Western Palaearctic Species Of The Subgenera Zimmermannia Hering And Ectoedemia Busck s.str. (Lepidoptera, Nepticulidae), With Notes On Their Phylogeny

Nepticulidae
Moths of Europe
Moths described in 1937